A supplied-air respirator (SAR) or air-line respirator is a device used in places where the air may not be safe. It uses an air hose to supply air from outside the danger zone. It is similar to a self-contained breathing apparatus (SCBA), except that SCBA users carry their air with them in tanks, while SAR users get it from a stationary air supply attached to them by a hose.

Description 
SARs are lightweight, but tether the user. Unlike SCBAs, the worker will not run out of air when the tank they carry is empty. They can therefore be used for longer continuous work periods. The mask end of a SAR is generally lower-maintenance than an SCBA, but the air compressors or tanks at the other end of the hose require monitoring and maintenance. It is important that they deliver good air; contaminants (which may also be introduced by faulty operation of the machinery) can be dangerous.

If the air-supply line is cut or pinched shut, the user will not have any air to breathe. SAR users therefore often carry a small backup air tank (called an auxiliary escape cylinder). In an emergency, they can switch to using this supply, which should last long enough for them to escape the dangerous area. This backup bottle is required in some jurisdictions. Other regulations also apply. Users of SARs must generally be given hands-on training with the specific model they are to use.

SARs may be either constant-flow or pressure-demand respirators. Constant-flow respirators supply a steady stream of air, some of which escapes from the wearer end unbreathed. Pressure-demand respirators supply air only when the pressure in the wearer's mask drops (that is, when they inhale). This saves air but allows more inwards leakage. Pressure-demand respirators can only be used with a sealed elastomeric mask, not with a loose-fitting hood (like those used in powered air-purifying respirators) or helmet (used in construction). Hoods may be made of Tyvek, polyethylene, or polypropylene.

Use 
According to the NIOSH Respirator Selection Logic, SARs with an auxiliary SCBA are recommended for oxygen-deficient atmospheres, atmospheres that are immediately dangerous to life or health, and unknown atmospheres, all of which are conditions that air-purifying respirators such as N95 masks do not protect against.   SARs without an auxiliary SCBA may also be used in conditions where an air-purifying respirator may be used, and have the benefit of a higher range of assigned protection factors (APF).  Air-purifying respirators have APFs in the range 5–50 while SARs are in the range 25–2000, and full-facepiece pressure-demand SARs with an auxiliary pressure-demand SCBA have an APF of 10,000.  For substances hazardous to the eyes, a respirator equipped with a full facepiece, helmet, or hood is recommended.  SARs are not effective during firefighting, for which a SCBA is recommended instead.

References

External links

Industrial breathing sets
Breathing gases
Functional masks
Respirators